Erytus is a genus of dung beetles in the subfamily Aphodiinae. There are about 11 described species in Erytus.

Species
 Erytus aequalis (Schmidt, 1907)
 Erytus bucharicus (Petrovitz, 1961)
 Erytus cognatus (Fairmaire, 1860)
 Erytus hormonzensis (Petrovitz, 1980)
 Erytus lindemannae (Balthasar, 1960)
 Erytus opacior (Koshantschikov, 1894)
 Erytus persicus (Petrovitz, 1961)
 Erytus pruinosus (Reitter, 1892)
 Erytus psammophilus (Balthasar, 1941)
 Erytus tekkensis (Petrovitz, 1961)
 Erytus transcaspicus (Petrovitz, 1961)

References

Scarabaeidae
Scarabaeidae genera